Cerdocyonina is an extant subtribe of the canines and is exclusively endemic to the Americas. Often described to be "fox-like" in appearance and behavior, they are more closely related to the wolf-like canids such as Canis than they are to the fox genus Vulpes. Its members are colloquially known as the South American canids and there are 10 extant species. They are sometimes referred to as South American foxes in the older literature, but the term zorro has been recommended by mammalogists to avoid confusion with the true foxes of the tribe Vulpini, which includes the genus Vulpes.

Taxonomy
Cerdocyonina is a natural lineage whose common ancestor was sister to the Eucyon–Canis–Lycaon lineage. It is represented in the fossil record by Cerdocyon 6–5 million years ago, and by Theriodictis and Chrysocyon 5–4 million years ago. It most likely emerged from Central America.

The fossil of a large form of the extinct Theriodictis that dates 2 million years ago was found in Florida. The maned wolf and an extinct species of the crab-eating zorro were in North America around this time, which was before the Isthmus of Panama came into being, indicating the origin of the Cerdocyonina in North America.

Prior to the 1990s there have been different systematic hypotheses pertaining to the relationships among South American canids, most frequent was the notion of there being three genera and subgenera (after Langguth 1969 and 1970):
 Genus Cerdocyon
 Subgenus Atelocynus
 Subgenus Cerdocyon
 Subgenus Speothos
 Genus Dusicyon
 Subgenus Lycalopex (Langguth recognized it as "Pseudalopex")
 Subgenus †Dusicyon
 Genus Chrysocyon

Morphological and DNA evidence shows that the South American canids, being the most diverse group of canids on any continent, forms its own natural group.

In 2018, a study found that the extinct South American Canis gezi did not fall under genus Canis and should be classified under the Cerdocyonina, however no genus was proposed.

The cladogram below is based on the phylogeny of Lindblad-Toh et al. (2005), modified to incorporate recent findings on Lycalopex species and Dusicyon.

References

 
Animal subtribes
Canini (tribe)